Joseph Lafontaine is the name of:
 Joseph Lafontaine (Shefford MLA) (1839–1904), notary, mayor and politician in Quebec
 Joseph Lafontaine (Berthier MLA) (1865–1920), farmer, mayor and politician in Quebec
 Joseph Lafontaine (Quebec MP) (1885–1965), merchant and member of the Canadian House of Commons from Quebec